Elmwood Memorial Park is a cemetery located in Abilene, Taylor County, Texas, United States. It has in excess of 30,000 interments. The first burials at this cemetery took place in 1946.

Notable burials
One-time professional baseball player Jesse Winters is interred there. Other notables include actor James Drury and football player Jim Parmer.

References

External links
 

Cemeteries in Texas
Buildings and structures in Abilene, Texas